Aggeliki Daliani (Greek: Αγγελική Δαλιάνη; born August 11, 1979) is a Greek actress and entrepreneur. She is best known for her role as Maria in Maria, i Aschimi, the Greek edition of the television series Betty la Fea.

Early life
Daliani was born on August 11, 1979 in Athens even her origin is from Kalamata. She has a 6-year younger sister Panagiota Daliani. She graduated the Department of Communication and Media Studies of the National and Kapodistrian University of Athens and the Department of the Greek Culture of the Hellenic Open University. She worked as a reporter for 5 years in a gossip magazine. She left reporting for acting.

Career
In 2005, she made her television debut in ANT1 series "Min Mou Les Antio" with a recurring role of 10 episodes. In 2006 she had a guest role for 2 episodes in Mega series "Hrthe kai Edese".

In 2006, she passed from audition for the role of Maria Papasotiriou in Mega series Maria, i Aschimi, the Greek edition of the television series Betty la Fea. It was her first main role in a television series. The series were viewed for 2 seasons between 2007-2008. But due to the success of the series, she decided with the channel to be appearing with her ugly look during the first time of the series viewing. However, the press found and showed old photographs with her normal look. This series made her known in the public and during that time, she was the most popular person in the country.

After the end of the series, she appeared in her third Mega series called "Ola ston Aera" with a Guest role in 1 episode. During the episode filming, she was pregnant in her first child.

In theatre, she has appeared in numerous theatrical performances such as: "The Bacchae" (2004-2005), "Erotika Paixnidia" (2006-2007), "To Asximopapo" (2007-2008), "Den Plirono, Den Plirono" (2008-2009), "Paizoun to Tragoudi Mas" (2010-2012), "The Miracle Worker" (2012-2013), "Pontikopagida" (2014-2015), "Boeing Boeing" (2016-2018) and "My Friend Lefterakis" (Summer 2018).

In 2019, she returned to television after a 10-year absence with her second in her career and her first main role since Maria, i Aschimi in ANT1 series "H Epistrofi" in the role of "Athena Sideri". Her main role started from the 85th episode.

Personal life
In 2003, Daliani began dating actor Manos Papayiannis. On May 3, 2009 she gave birth to their first child, a daughter, Lydia Papayianni and on September 12, 2009 the couple married. On September 16, 2017, Daliani gave birth to their second child, a son, Nikitas Papayiannis, who was born earlier in 8 months.  In August 2013, Daliani and Papayiannis opened a Cafeteria-Bar called "Sweeney Todd".

Filmography

Television

Theatre

External links 
 Aggeliki's Official Website
 

Greek actresses
Living people
1979 births
21st-century Greek actresses
Greek film actresses
Actresses from Athens